Coro and its Port is a UNESCO World Heritage site, located in the city of Coro, in Venezuela.  Coro is inland, but has a port, La Vela de Coro, on the Caribbean coast.

History

World Heritage site 
Coro and its Port was listed as a World Heritage site in 1993, following the criteria (iv) and (v). With its earthen constructions unique to the Caribbean, Coro is the only surviving example of a rich fusion of local traditions with Spanish Mudéjar and Dutch architectural techniques. One of the first colonial towns (founded in 1527), it has some 602 historic buildings.

World Heritage in Danger 
In 2005, the site was inscribed on the list of World Heritage in Danger. One of the factors in deeming the site to be at risk was damage caused by heavy rains. A need was also identified to protect the site from unsympathetic development, and in this regard it was proposed to redefine the buffer zones.

In 2018 UNESCO received a report from the International Council on Monuments and Sites (ICOMOS), noting that while information provided by the "State Party" (i.e. Venezuela) demonstrated satisfactory advances in the implementation of many corrective measures, further information and actions were needed to ensure that the key issues previously identified as affecting the property had been adequately addressed.

Sources

References 

World Heritage Sites in Venezuela
World Heritage Sites in Danger
Coro, Venezuela